Goyang Gymnasium, also known as Goyang Indoor Stadium, is an indoor sporting arena. It is part of Goyang Sports Complex, located in Goyang, South Korea. The capacity of the arena is 6,216 for basketball matches. Goyang Carrot Jumpers of the Korean Basketball League are the tenants. The venue hosted fencing at the 2014 Asian Games.

References

External links
Official website 

Indoor arenas in South Korea
Basketball venues in South Korea
Sports venues completed in 2011
Venues of the 2014 Asian Games
Sport in Goyang
Sports venues in Gyeonggi Province